Iliana Nikolova is a Bulgarian sprint canoer who competed in the late 1970s. She won a silver medal in the K-4 500 m event at the 1978 ICF Canoe Sprint World Championships in Belgrade.

References

Bulgarian female canoeists
Living people
Year of birth missing (living people)
ICF Canoe Sprint World Championships medalists in kayak